Carlia wundalthini, the Cape Melville rainbow-skink is a species of skink in the genus Carlia. It is endemic to Cape Melville National Park in Queensland in Australia.

References

Carlia
Reptiles described in 2014
Endemic fauna of Australia
Skinks of Australia
Taxa named by Conrad J. Hoskin